Tsering Döndrup (Tibetan: ཚེ་རིང་དོན་གྲུབ) is a Tibetan author from Malho. Döndrup was born in 1961 to a family of ethnically Mongolian nomadic herders. He is a historian and a major writer in contemporary Tibetan literature.

Biography 
Döndrup studied Tibetan language and literature at  the Qinghai Nationalities Institute in Xining and the Northwest Nationalities Institute in Lanzhou. An early member of the Tibetan New Literature movement of the 1980s, Döndrup's work has continued to be relevant.

Several of his books have been translated into French and Chinese. A collection of his short stories, The Handsome Monk And Other Stories, was translated into English and published by Columbia University Press in 2019. His novel about the 1958 Amdo uprising, The Red Wind Howls, was never formally published, though copies circulate on the black market. He lost his job and passport as a result of writing this book.

Books 
 Ancestors (Mes po), 2001
 Fog (Smug pa), 2002
 The Red Wind Howls (Rlung dmar ‘ur ‘ur), 2009
 My Two Fathers, 2015
 The Handsome Monk, 2019

References 

Tibetan writers
1961 births
Living people
People from Huangnan